The list of shipwrecks in 1974 includes ships sunk, foundered, grounded, or otherwise lost during 1974.

January

1 January

7 January

16 January

19 January

22 January

27 January

29 January

Unknown date

February

1 February

3 February

4 February

9 February

10 February

13 February

15 February

19 February

22 February

Unknown date

March

5 March

6 March

8 March

10 March

23 March

27 March

April

16 October

8 April

15 April

May

9 May

12 May

16 May

19 May

24 May

26 May

June

1 June

20 June

23 June

28 June

July

1 July

13 July

16 July

21 July

23 July

24 July

29 July

August

1 August

2 August

8 August

9 August

11 August

12 August

22 August

30 August

Unknown date

September

2 September

3 September

5 September

9 September

13 September

18 September

19 September

23 September

26 September

29 September

30 September

October

4 October

13 October

14 October

15 October

17 October

28 October

29 October

November

1 November

4 November

19 November

21 November

23 November

24 November

28 November

December

24 December

25 December

31 December

Unknown date

References

See also 

1974
 
Ships